The large moth family Gelechiidae contains the following genera:

Faculta
Fapua
Faristenia
Fascista
Ficulea
Filatima
Filisignella
Flexiptera
Fortinea
Friseria
Frumenta
Furcaphora
Furcatisacculus

References

 Natural History Museum Lepidoptera genus database

Gelechiidae
Gelechiid